Herbert Norman Morris (16 March 1889 – 14 July 1948) was an Australian rules footballer who played for the Melbourne Football Club in the Victorian Football League (VFL).

Notes

External links 

1889 births
Australian rules footballers from Victoria (Australia)
Melbourne Football Club players
1948 deaths